is an extended play CD released by girl idol group Berryz Kobo on December 7, 2005. It is the third of three releases issued by the band in the space of four weeks, along with their second album Dai 2 Seichōki and the ninth single "Gag 100kaibun Aishite Kudasai". "2.5" is pronounced nī ten go.

The EP contains five previously released tracks in the aforementioned ninth single's A-side, plus four earlier single sides. Only one track, "Arigatō! Tomodachi", is exclusive to the EP.

Former band member Maiha Ishimura appears, but is not credited, on tracks 3 to 6.

The album debuted at number 45 in the Oricon Weekly Album chart, remaining in the list for 2 weeks.

Track listing
 Gag 100kaibun Aishite Kudasai
 
 
 
 Piriri to Yukō!
 Anata Nashi de wa Ikite Yukenai

Personnel

Saki Shimizu - vocals and band leader
Momoko Tsugunaga - vocals
Chinami Tokunaga - vocals
Miyabi Natsuyaki - vocals
Maasa Sudo - vocals
Yurina Kumai - vocals
Risako Sugaya - vocals
Maiha Ishimura - vocals (Tracks 3-6, uncredited)
Yuichi Takahasi - keyboard and MIDI programming, guitar
Kaoru Kubota - backing vocals
Hideyuki "Daichi" Suzuki - keyboard and MIDI programming, guitar
Hiroaki Takeuchi - chorus
Koji Makaino - keyboard and MIDI programming
Shinsuke Suzuki - guitar
Hideyuki Komatsu - bass
Horishi Iida - percussion
Masato Yamao - organ
Tsunku - backing vocals
Amazons - backing vocals
Takao Konishi - keyboard and MIDI programming
Yasuo Asai - guitar
Yasushi Sasamoto - bass
Masanori Suzuki - trumpet
Yoshinari Takegami - saxophone
Satoshi Mizota - trombone
Shoichiro Hirata - keyboard and MIDI programming
Keiko "Chibi" Furuya - backing vocals
Akira - guitar, bass, keyboards, MIDI programming, backing vocals
Nobuyasu Umemoto - recording coordination
Kazumi Matsui - recording engineer, mix engineer
Ryo Wakizawa - recording engineer, mix engineer
Shinnosuke Kobayashi - recording engineer
Masakazu Kimura - mix engineer
Naoki Yamada - mix engineer
Yuji Yamashita - mix engineer
Tsunku - mix engineer
Yuichi Ohtsubo - 2nd engineer
Hirofumi Hiraki - 2nd engineer
Yōhei Horiuchi - 2nd engineer
Mitsuko Koike - mastering engineer

Charts

References

External links
Up-Front Works site entry

Berryz Kobo albums
2005 EPs
Piccolo Town-King Records EPs
2005 greatest hits albums